The Alor boobook (Ninox plesseni) is a species of owl in the family Strigidae. It is native to Pantar and Alor Islands in the eastern Lesser Sunda Islands.

References

Ninox
Birds described in 1929
Birds of Indonesia